Amlwch railway station was the original terminus of the Anglesey Central Railway line from Gaerwen. A light railway extension was later added for freight purposes. All stations on the Amlwch line closed to passengers in 1964 as part of the Beeching Axe; freight works continued until 1993.

History

Opened by the Anglesey Central Railway, then by the London and North Western Railway, it became part of the London, Midland and Scottish Railway during the Grouping of 1923. The station then passed on to the London Midland Region of British Railways on nationalisation in 1948. The last trains operated on 5 December 1964 after which it was then closed by the British Railways Board.

In August 2020, a bid was made for money to carry out a study to reopen the Anglesey Central Railway between Amlwch and the north Wales main line at Gaerwen. The plan is for regular diesel services for locals and occasional steam trains. The initial bid was made as part of the government's Restoring Your Railway initiative, which awards £50,000 to successful schemes to fund a feasibility study. The bid was submitted for the third round of that scheme and was awarded funding to carry out the study. When the bid was submitted, the Welsh government stated that they would match fund any award that was received, raising the value of the award to £100,000.

References

Further reading

External links
Station Picture 
 Station on navigable O.S. map

Disused railway stations in Anglesey
Railway stations in Great Britain opened in 1867
Railway stations in Great Britain closed in 1964
Former London and North Western Railway stations
Beeching closures in Wales
Amlwch
1867 establishments in Wales
1964 disestablishments in Wales